Andrew Clifford Broom (born Norwich, 1965) has been Archdeacon of the East Riding since 2014.

Initially a Youth worker, Broom was educated at Keele University and Trinity College, Bristol. He was ordained in 1993 and served curacies in Wellington and Brampton. He was Vicar of St John, Walton from 2000 until 2009, and Director of Mission and Ministry for the Diocese of Derby from 2009 until his appointment as Archdeacon.

References
 

1965 births
Clergy from Norwich
Alumni of Keele University
Archdeacons of the East Riding
Alumni of Trinity College, Bristol
Living people